If You Could See Me Now is an album by pianist Kenny Drew recorded in 1974 and released on the SteepleChase label.

Reception
The AllMusic review awarded the album 4 stars.

Track listing
 "In Your Own Sweet Way" (Dave Brubeck) – 7:32  
 "If You Could See Me Now" (Tadd Dameron, Carl Sigman) – 4:01  
 "All Souls Here" (Kenny Drew) – 5:21  
 "I'm Old Fashioned" (Jerome Kern, Johnny Mercer) – 5:55  
 "Free Flight" (Kenny Drew) – 6:14 Bonus track on CD   
 "Run Away" (Per Carsten) – 5:56 Bonus track on CD   
 "Summer Night" (Al Dubin, Harry Warren) – 3:58 Bonus track on CD   
 "A Stranger in Paradise" (Alexander Borodin, George Forrest, Robert Wright) – 7:53  
 "Prelude to a Kiss" (Duke Ellington, Irving Gordon, Irving Mills) – 5:05  
 "This Is the Moment" (Frederick Hollander) – 8:01  
 "Oleo" (Sonny Rollins) – 3:28

Personnel
Kenny Drew – piano
Niels-Henning Ørsted Pedersen – bass
Albert Heath – drums

References

Kenny Drew albums
1975 albums
SteepleChase Records albums